Spinomantis guibei is a species of frog in the Mantellid subfamily Mantellinae, endemic to Madagascar.

Taxonomy
This species was originally described as a secondary homonym of Gephyromantis elegans by Guibé in 1974. A new name, Mantidactylus guibei was given for this species by Blommers-Schlösser in 1991. Dubois placed this species in the then-subgenus Blommersia, but it was later transferred to Spinomantis.

Habitat and Ecology
Its natural habitats are subtropical or tropical moist montane forests and rocky areas.
It is threatened by habitat loss.

References

Endemic fauna of Madagascar
Amphibians described in 1991
Taxonomy articles created by Polbot